The Pedernales River is a tributary of the Colorado River, approximately  long, in Central Texas in the United States. It drains an area of the Edwards Plateau, flowing west to east across the Texas Hill Country west of Austin. The name "Pedernales", first used in the middle 18th century, comes from a Spanish word for the flint rocks characteristic of the riverbed.

Description
It flows north into southeast Kimble County and then east into Gillespie County, passing south of Fredericksburg, and into Blanco County, passing north of Johnson City.

The river has a close association with the Texas Hill Country, tied to the history of the region and emblematic of its geography. Along its route it flows over numerous rugged limestone escarpments as it winds eastward, passing along the south side of the ranch of President Lyndon B. Johnson, who grew up in nearby Stonewall, south of the river.

In 1750, Fray Benito Fernández de Santa Ana proposed a plan to the Spanish government that a mission be established among the Lipan Apache who lived along the river. In 1789, the river was the site of a skirmish between Colonel Francisco Xavier Ugalde and a group of Lipan and Mescalero Indians. The first permanent white settlement along the river was in 1846, when the town of Fredericksburg was established by German immigrants. The threat of raids from Apaches restricted settlement in the area until the 1880s.

Pedernales Falls State Park is located along the river in Blanco County east of Johnson City. Like many rivers in central Texas, it is prone to variable water levels. A sign at the state park shows a relatively tranquil river in one picture and a raging wall of muddy water in the next picture, said to be taken only five minutes after the first. The speed at which flash floods can arise along this river has resulted in several deaths at the park, and warning sirens have been installed in the park and elsewhere along the river. The lower river is a popular destination for whitewater rafting during the high-water season.

See also
List of Texas rivers
Llano River
Frio River
Brazos River
White River (Texas)
Pecos River
Rio Grande

References

External links
Pedernales Falls State Park
NPS: Lyndon B. Johnson National Historical Park
USGS-GNS: Pedernales River

Rivers of Texas
Tributaries of the Colorado River (Texas)
Rivers of Kimble County, Texas
Rivers of Gillespie County, Texas
Rivers of Blanco County, Texas
Rivers of Travis County, Texas
Texas Hill Country